UK Commercial Property Trust is a large British investment trust dedicated to investments in UK commercial properties. Established in 2006, the company is a constituent of the FTSE 250 Index. The chairman is Andrew Wilson. It invests in shopping centres, shops, office buildings and industrial estates and warehousing/distribution centres.

History
UKCPT was established in 2006 in Guernsey, prior to the introduction of REIT legislation in 2007, which made on-shore property investment companies more tax-efficient. It acquired its initial portfolio of properties from Phoenix & London Assurance/Phoenix Life & Pensions Limited in 2007 for £503.6m; the portfolio was then yielding under 5%.

Having launched near the top of the market, following the market downturn in 2007–2008, a merger with F&C Commercial Property Trust, a fellow FTSE 250 property company was proposed in 2010. This was narrowly rejected by 50.07% of shareholders.

References

External links
  Official Site

Investment trusts of the United Kingdom
British companies established in 2006
Real estate companies established in 2006
Financial services companies established in 2006
Companies listed on the London Stock Exchange